D-Psicose (C6H12O6), also known as D-allulose, or simply allulose, is a low-calorie epimer of the monosaccharide sugar fructose, used by some major commercial food and beverage manufacturers as a low-calorie sweetener. First identified in wheat in the 1940s, allulose is naturally present in small quantities in certain foods.

The U.S. Food and Drug Administration (FDA) has accepted a petition for Generally Recognized As Safe (GRAS) for allulose as a sugar substitute in various specified food categories. Because it is absorbed and metabolized differently from other sugars, the FDA has exempted allulose from the listing of total and added sugars on the Nutrition and Supplement Facts labels, but requires the labeling of 0.4kcal/g as carbohydrate.

Dietary effect
A meta-analysis was conducted of the effect on postprandial glucose and insulin responses of adding a median of 5 grams of allulose (range, 2.5-10 g) to a fixed carbohydrate-containing drink or meal, versus the same meal alone. Five studies were included, with a median of 18 largely middle-aged participants, including nondiabetic subjects in three studies and subjects with pre-diabetes and/or Type II diabetes in the other two. Three of the 5 studies used a reference 75 gram oral glucose tolerance test (OGTT) for at least one comparison; some studies used other glucose-containing foods either as the sole comparison or as an additional arm along with the OGTT, for a total of ten comparisons. To control for sweetness, aspartame was added to the control preparation in two of the five studies. Overall, compared to the carbohydrate-containing meal alone, the same meal with a small dose of added allulose resulted in a 10% lower integrated area under the curve (iAUC) of postprandial glucose. The quality of the evidence was rated as moderate.

Biochemistry
The sweetness of allulose is estimated to be 70% of the sweetness of sucrose. It has some cooling sensation and no bitterness. Its taste is said to be sugar-like, in contrast to certain other sweeteners, like the high-intensity artificial sweeteners aspartame and saccharin. The caloric value of allulose in humans is about 0.2 to 0.4 kcal/g, relative to about 4 kcal/g for typical carbohydrates. In rats, the relative energy value of allulose was found to be 0.007 kcal/g, or approximately 0.3% of that of sucrose. Similar to the sugar alcohol erythritol, allulose is minimally metabolized and is excreted largely unchanged. The glycemic index of allulose is very low or negligible.

Allulose is a weak inhibitor of the enzymes α-glucosidase, α-amylase, maltase, and sucrase. Because of this, it can inhibit the metabolism of starch and disaccharides into monosaccharides in the gastrointestinal tract. Additionally, allulose inhibits the absorption of glucose via transporters in the intestines. For these reasons, allulose has potential antihyperglycemic effects, and has been found to reduce postprandial hyperglycemia in humans. Through modulation of lipogenic enzymes in the liver, allulose may also have antihyperlipidemic effects.

Due to its effect of causing incomplete absorption of carbohydrates from the gastrointestinal tract, and subsequent fermentation of these carbohydrates by intestinal bacteria, allulose can result in unpleasant symptoms such as flatulence, abdominal discomfort, and diarrhea. The maximum non-effect dose of allulose in causing diarrhea in humans has been found to be 0.55 g/kg of body weight. This is higher than that of most sugar alcohols (0.17–0.42 g/kg), but is less than that of erythritol (0.66–1.0+ g/kg).

D-allulose was found to be more reactive than fructose and glucose in glycation reactions.

Chemistry

Allulose, also known by its systematic name D-ribo-2-hexulose as well as by the name D-psicose, is a monosaccharide and a ketohexose. It is a C3 epimer of fructose. Fructose can be converted to allulose by the enzyme D-tagatose 3-epimerase, which has allowed for mass production of allulose. The compound is found naturally in trace amounts in wheat, figs, raisins, maple syrup, and molasses. Allulose has similar physical properties to those of regular sugar, such as bulk, mouthfeel, browning capability, and freeze point. This makes it favorable for use as a sugar replacement in food products, including ice cream.

History
Allulose was first discovered in the 1940s. The first mass-production method for allulose was established when Ken Izumori at Kagawa University in Japan discovered the key enzyme, D-tagatose 3-epimerase, to convert fructose to allulose in 1994. This method of production has a high yield, but suffers from a very high production cost.

In June 2012, the U.S. Food and Drug Administration (FDA) accepted the assertion of CJ CheilJedang, Inc. that allulose is Generally Recognized As Safe (GRAS) as a sugar substitute in various specified food categories. In June 2014, a similar GRAS letter was issued to Matsutani Chemical Industry Company, Ltd. The first Non-GMO allulose was manufactured by Samyang Corporation. Allulose is not approved for use in the European Union.

In October 2019, the FDA announced exemption of allulose from total and added sugars on nutritional label but adding 0.4kcal/g as carbohydrate.  

Studies have shown the commercial product is not absorbed in the human body the way common sugars are and does not raise insulin levels, but more testing may be needed to evaluate any other potential side effects.

Manufacturing
As of 2018, most commercially available allulose was produced from corn. Allulose is also produced from beet sugar.

Commercial application 
Commercial manufacturers and food laboratories are looking into properties of allulose that may differentiate it from sucrose and fructose sweeteners, including an ability to induce the high foaming property of egg white protein and the production of antioxidant substances produced through the Maillard reaction.

Commercial uses of allulose include low-calorie sweeteners in beverages, yogurt, ice cream, baked goods, and other typically high-calorie items. London-based Tate & Lyle released its proprietary variant of allulose, known as Dolcia Prima allulose, and U.S.-based Anderson Global Group released its own proprietary variant into the North American market in 2015. The first major food company to adopt allulose as a sweetener was Quest Nutrition in some of their protein bar products.

On April 16, 2019, US Food and Drug Administration (FDA) issued a draft guidance, allowing food manufacturers to exclude allulose from total and added sugar counts on Nutrition and Supplement Facts labels. Like sugar alcohols and dietary fiber, allulose will still count towards total carbohydrates on nutrition labels. This, combined with the GRAS designation, has increased interest in including allulose in food products instead of sucrose.

References

Ketohexoses